Conconully Dam (National ID # WA00259) is a dam in Okanogan County, Washington, United States.

Conconully Dam impounds Salmon Creek for flood control and irrigation storage, part of the larger Okanogan Project.  It was listed on the National Register of Historic Places on September 6, 1974.  The adjacent 1921 Salmon Lake Dam and its reservoir, Conconully Lake, are also part of the same project.  Both are owned by the Bureau and operated by the local Okanogan Irrigation District.

The Conconully Reservoir has a normal water surface area of 550 acres and a maximum storage capacity of 13,000 acre-feet.  Recreation includes fishing (for rainbow trout, cutthroat trout and smallmouth bass), boating, camping, hiking and wildlife viewing.  Conconully State Park and Conconully National Wildlife Refuge are also nearby.

History 

The construction of the dam was interrupted by a strike in July 1909. The construction workers were offered a twenty-five cent per day pay increase but demanded fifty cents. Notice of the strike was published in the Industrial Worker, a weekly newspaper of the Industrial Workers of the World published out of Spokane.

References 

1911 establishments in Washington (state)
Dams completed in 1911
Dams on the National Register of Historic Places in Washington (state)
Lakes of Okanogan County, Washington
Reservoirs in Washington (state)
United States Bureau of Reclamation dams
National Register of Historic Places in Okanogan County, Washington